This is a list of novelists from France. Novelists in this list should be notable in some way, and ideally have Wikipedia articles on them.

See also French novelists Category Index.

Honoré d'Urfé (1568–1625)
Charles Sorel (c. 1602–1674)
Madeleine de Scudéry (1607–1701)
Madame de Lafayette (1634–1693), author of La Princesse de Clèves
Alain-René Le Sage (1668–1747)
Pierre de Marivaux (1688–1763)
Voltaire (1694–1778), philosophe, satirist, playwright, author of Candide
Françoise de Graffigny (1695–1758), author of Lettres d'une Péruvienne
Abbé Prévost (1697–1763), author of Manon Lescaut
Claude Prosper Jolyot de Crébillon (1707–1777)
Jean-Jacques Rousseau (1712–1778), philosophe, author of Julie, or the New Heloise
Denis Diderot (1713–1784), philosophe, author of Rameau's Nephew
Marie Jeanne Riccoboni (1714–1792)
Restif de la Bretonne (1734–1806)
Jacques-Henri Bernardin de Saint-Pierre (1737–1814), author of Paul et Virginie
Marquis de Sade (1740–1814), author of "Dialogue Between a Priest and a Dying Man", Justine, The 120 Days of Sodom, Philosophy in the Bedroom, and Juliette
Choderlos de Laclos (1741–1803), author of Les Liaisons dangereuses
Anne Louise Germaine de Staël (1766–1817)
Benjamin Constant (1767–1830), author of Adolphe
Sophie de Renneville (1772–1822), writer, editor, journalist
François-René de Chateaubriand (1768–1848), author of Atala and René
Étienne Pivert de Senancour (1770–1846)
Charles Nodier (1780–1844)
Stendhal (1783–1842), author of The Red and the Black, considered by some to be the first modern novel, and The Charterhouse of Parma
Élise Voïart, (1786–1866), writer and translator
Charles Paul de Kock (1793–1871)
Antoinette Henriette Clémence Robert (1797–1872)
Charles Dezobry (1798–1871), historian and historical novelist
Honoré de Balzac (1799–1850), author of La Comédie Humaine, a series of novels presenting a full picture of France in the early 19th century
Alexandre Dumas, père (1802–1870), author of The Count of Monte Cristo and The Three Musketeers
Victor Hugo (1802–1885), author of The Hunchback of Notre Dame and Les Misérables
Prosper Mérimée (1803–1870), author of Carmen
Charles Augustin Sainte-Beuve (1804–1869)
George Sand (1804–1876), pseudonym of Amantine Aurore Lucile Dupin, Baroness Dudevant
Eugène Sue (1804–1857)
Jules Amédée Barbey d'Aurevilly (1808–1889)
Alfred de Musset (1810–1857)
Théophile Gautier (1811–1872)
Gustave Flaubert (1821–1880), author of Madame Bovary and Sentimental Education
Edmond de Goncourt (1822–1896)
Henri Murger (1822–1861), author of Scènes de la vie de bohème
Alexandre Dumas, fils (1824–1895), author of La Dame aux camélias
Edmond About (1828–1885)
Jules Verne (1828–1905), writer of techno-thrillers like Twenty Thousand Leagues under the Sea, and founding father of science fiction
Pauline Cassin Caro (1828/34/35 - 1901), novelist
Jules de Goncourt (1830–1870)
Hector Malot (1830–1907)
Émile Gaboriau (1832–1873), pioneer of modern detective fiction
Eugène Le Roy (1836–1907)
Alphonse Daudet (1840–1897)
Émile Zola (1840–1902), naturalist, author of Germinal and Nana
Anatole France (1844–1924)
Léon Bloy (1846–1917)
Brada (1847-1938)
Joris-Karl Huysmans (1848–1907), author of À rebours and Là-bas
Guy de Maupassant (1850–1893)
Pierre Loti (1850–1923)
Élémir Bourges (1852–1925)
Paul Bourget (1852–1935)
René Bazin (1853–1932)
Adolphe Chenevière (1855–19??)
Maurice Barrès (1862–1923)
Henri de Régnier (1864–1936)
Jules Renard (1864–1910)
Mathilde Alanic (1864-1948)
Marie Léra (1864-1958)
Juliette Heuzey (1865-1952)
Romain Rolland (1866–1944), Nobel Prize in Literature, 1915
Gaston Leroux (1868–1927), author of The Phantom of the Opera and The Mystery of the Yellow Room which is recognized as the first locked room puzzle mystery novel
Gabrielle Réval (1869-1938)
André Gide (1869–1951)
Henri Bordeaux (1870–1963)
Marcel Proust (1871–1922), author of In Search of Lost Time, sometimes seen as the greatest modernist novel
Colette (1873–1954), best known for Gigi and Chéri
Alfred Jarry (1873–1907), satirist, inventor of Pataphysics
Fanny Clar (1875-1944)
Louisa Emily Dobrée (fl. ca. 1877–1917)
Roger Martin du Gard (1881–1958), Nobel Prize in Literature, 1937
Louis Pergaud (1882–1915)
Rose Combe (1883–1932)
Georges Duhamel (1884–1966)
François Mauriac (1885–1970), Nobel Prize in Literature, 1952
Jules Romains (1885–1972)
Alain-Fournier (1886–1914)
Ève Paul-Margueritte (1885-1971)
Lucie Paul-Margueritte (1886-1955)
René Maran (1887-1960)
Georges Bernanos (1888–1948)
Adrien Bertrand (1888–1917)
Henri Bosco (1888–1976)
Louis Ferdinand Céline (1894–1961), author of Journey to the End of the Night and Death on the Installment Plan or Mort à Crédit
Henri de Montherlant (1895–1972)
Jean Giono (1895–1970)
Julien Green (1900–1998)
Antoine de Saint Exupéry (1900–1944)
Nathalie Sarraute (1900–1999)
André Malraux (1901–1976)
Marie-Magdeleine Carbet (1902-1996)
Irène Némirovsky (1903–1942), author of Suite française
Raymond Queneau (1903–1976)
Pierre Herbart (1903–1974)
Marguerite Yourcenar (1903–1987)
Raymond Radiguet (1903–1923)
Jean-Paul Sartre (1905–1980), Nobel Prize in Literature, 1964
Jeanine Delpech (1905-1992)
Louise Aslanian (1906–1945), pseudonym "Las", author of "The Way of doubt".
Pauline Réage (1907–1998)
Simone de Beauvoir (1908–1986)
Paul Berna (1908–1994)
Alix André (1909-2000)
Jean Genet (1910–1986)
Jean-Louis Baghio'o (1910-1994)
Raphaël Tardon (1911-1967)
Henri Troyat (1911–2007)
Pierre Boulle (1912–1994), author of The Bridge on the River Kwai and Planet of the Apes
Albert Camus (1913–1960), Nobel Prize in Literature, 1957
Gilbert Cesbron (1913–1979)
Claude Simon (1913–2005), Nobel Prize in Literature, 1985
Romain Gary (1914–1980), winner of the Goncourt prize twice, 1956, and 1975 under the pseudonym of Emile Ajar 
Marguerite Duras (1914–1996)
Joseph Zobel (1915-2006)
Maurice Druon (1918–2009)
Boris Vian (1920–1959)
Alain Robbe-Grillet (1922–2008)
Salvat Etchart (1924-1985)
Michel Tournier (1924-2016)
Philippe Daudy (1925–1994)
Michel Butor (1926-2016)
Édouard Glissant (1928-2011)
André Schwarz-Bart (1928-2006)
Sébastien Japrisot (1931–2003)
Emmanuelle Arsan (1932-2005)
Jean Bernabé (1942-2017)
Régine Deforges (1935-2014)
Françoise Sagan (1935–2004)
Georges Perec (1936–1982)
Maryse Condé (born 1937)
J.M.G. Le Clézio (born 1940), Nobel Prize in Literature, 2008
Annie Ernaux (born 1940)
Marie-Reine de Jaham (born 1940)
Patrick Modiano (born 1945), Nobel Prize in Literature, 2014
Daniel Maximin (born 1947)
Raphaël Confiant (born 1951)
Kama Sywor Kamanda (born 1952)
Patrick Chamoiseau (born 1953)
Nancy Huston (born 1953)
Gisèle Pineau (born 1956)
Fred Vargas (born 1957)
Michel Houellebecq (born 1958), Impact award winner
Éric-Emmanuel Schmitt (born 1960)
Charles Dantzig (born 1961)
Pavel Hak (born 1962)
Beatrice Hammer (born 1963)
Fabienne Kanor (born 1970)
Laurent Binet (born 1972)

References

See also
French literature
Francophone literature
List of French language authors
List of French language poets
List of French people
List of novelists
List of people by nationality
List of people by occupation

French novelists
French
Novelists